The Second Toafa Ministry was the 12th ministry of the Government of Tuvalu, led by Prime Minister Maatia Toafa.

It succeeded the Ielemia Ministry, which was voted out of office after the 2010 election.

The  Second Toafa Ministry was sworn in by Governor-General Sir Iakoba Italeli on 29 September 2010. However the ministry had a short term in office as the Prime Minister and his ministry was brought down by the opposition's vote of no confidence, and as a result, was succeeded by the Telavi Ministry, led by Willy Telavi, who was appointed as prime minister on 24 December 2010 after crossing the floor to bring down the government.

Cabinet

References

2010 in Tuvalu
Politics of Tuvalu
Tuvaluan politicians
Ministries of Elizabeth II